Lake Gogebic State Park is a public recreation area covering  in the Upper Peninsula of Michigan. The state park sits on the western shore of Lake Gogebic, the largest inland lake in the Upper Peninsula. The land around the park is sparsely populated, and relatively flat.

History
In 1926, Gogebic County purchased land on Lake Gogebic, which it gave to the State of Michigan. E. J. Stickley and W. Bonafas gave additional land to the state and in 1930 the park opened. Two gravestones discovered in the park in 1962, engraved "1822 JOHN KEY" and "1824 WHITH", are thought by researchers to be those of fur traders or others dealing with Native Americans.

Activities and amenities
The park offers nearly a mile of beach front access, fishing, swimming, boat launch, camping, picnicking, and a  nature trail through the Ottawa National Forest.

References

External links
Lake Gogebic State Park Michigan Department of Natural Resources
Lake Gogebic State Park Map Michigan Department of Natural Resources
Lake Gogebic State Park Protected Planet

State parks of Michigan
Protected areas of Gogebic County, Michigan
Protected areas established in 1930